Allmand Alexander McKoy (Roberto 11, 1825 – November 11, 1885) was a North Carolina lawyer, military officer and Democratic party politician who served in the North Carolina Senate and as a judge of the Superior Court of North Carolina.

Early life
McKoy was born on October 11, 1825, to Dr. William and Ann Hall McKoy in Clinton, North Carolina.

Family life
McKoy married Lydia Anciaux  Howard.  They had five children, two who lived to adulthood Thomas Hall McKoy, Susan Howard McKoy, and three who died as children, Ann McKoy, Carrie McKoy, John McKoy.

Education
McKoy attended the University of North Carolina.

Political career
From 1858 to 1859 McKoy served in the North Carolina Senate.

Civil War and military service
During the Civil War McKoy was, under the Sequestration law, a receiver for the Confederate Government. McKoy joined the North Carolina Militia on February 15, 1861, serving as a colonel in the 24th Regiment, North Carolina Militia.   From 1863 to 1864 McKoy was a lieutenant colonel in the 27th Battalion North Carolina Home Guards.  On December 22, 1864, McKoy was appointed a  colonel in the 8th North Carolina Senior Reserves.

Post war careers

Business career
After the American Civil war McKoy practiced law in Clinton, North Carolina.

Political career
McKoy was a delegate to the North Carolina Constitutional Convention of 1865–1866. McKoy was an unsuccessful candidate for the U.S. Congress in 1868 losing to Republican Oliver H. Dockery.  From 1874 to 1875 he was a Judge of the North Carolina Superior Court.

Death and burial
McKoy died in Clinton, North Carolina, on November 11, 1885, and he was buried in the Clinton cemetery.

References

1825 births
1885 deaths
North Carolina lawyers
People from Clinton, North Carolina
University of North Carolina at Chapel Hill alumni
North Carolina Democrats
19th-century American lawyers